"Hari Up Hari" is a song by Adrian Sherwood featuring vocals by Shara Nelson released as a 12" single in 2003 on Real World Records.

Track listing

12" Single

 Hari Up Hari (Shara Nelson Vocal Version) 3:46
 The Ignorant Version (The Bug Remix) 4:49

References

External links

2003 singles
Shara Nelson songs
2003 songs
Songs written by Steven "Lenky" Marsden
Songs written by Shara Nelson